Lycée Franco-Libanais may refer to:
 Grand Lycée Franco-Libanais
 The Lycée Franco-Libanais Tripoli
 Lycée Franco-Libanais Habbouche-Nabatieh
 Lycée Franco-Libanais Nahr-Ibrahim